Horkelia rydbergii is a species of flowering plant in the rose family known by the common name Rydberg's horkelia. It is endemic to the Transverse Ranges of southern California, where it grows in several types of habitat, including pine forest. This is a perennial herb producing a low mat of hairy, glandular gray-green foliage around a woody base. The leaves are mostly flat and made up of pairs of hairy, wedge-shaped leaflets with toothed tips. The inflorescence is an open array of up to 40 flowers atop an erect stalk, each flower made up of five pointed green sepals and five white petals. At the center of the flower is a cone of 10 stamens around a bunch of up to 50 pistils.

References

External links
Jepson Manual Treatment
Photo gallery

rydbergii
Flora of California